Asada is a small lunar impact crater located at the northern edge of Mare Fecunditatis, to the northeast of the crater Taruntius. It is a circular crater formation with inner walls that slope down toward a small central floor at the midpoint. Asada was designated Taruntius A prior to being named by the IAU.

References

External links
 
 Oblique view of Asada crater from Apollo 10 (AS10-30-4426)

Impact craters on the Moon